Sardinian dialects may refer to any of the following linguistic varieties of the Sardinian language, broadly divided into two subgroups:

the North-Central dialects, employing the Logudorese orthography;
the South-Central dialects, employing the Campidanese orthography.

Some other varieties spoken in Northern Sardinia, while more related to Corsican rather than Sardinian, are also often considered Sardinian dialects:

the Gallurese varieties;
the Sassarese varieties.